Sillia is a genus of fungi within the Sydowiellaceae family.

Species
As accepted by Species Fungorum;
Sillia albofusca 
Sillia biformis 
Sillia celastrina 
Sillia ferruginea 
Sillia italica 
Sillia kamatii 
Sillia karstenii 
Sillia theae 

Former species;
 S. betulina  = Vleugelia betulina, Sordariomycetes
 S. cinctula  = Tortilispora cinctula, Sydowiellaceae
 S. longipes  = Pseudovalsa longipes, Coryneaceae

References

External links
Sillia at Index Fungorum

Diaporthales